Joanne M. Kelly  is a Canadian actress, known for her appearances in films such as Going the Distance, and in the TV series Warehouse 13 as the character Myka Bering, a Secret Service agent.

Early life and education
Joanne Kelly was born in Bay d'Espoir, Newfoundland. She moved to Nova Scotia at the age of 17, where she entered Acadia University, studying drama and English.

Career
Kelly's first major role was in the 2002 film drama, The Bay of Love and Sorrows, which followed smaller roles in the 2003 made-for-television movie, Mafia Doctor (starring Paul Sorvino and Olympia Dukakis), and in the film Crime Spree (starring Gérard Depardieu and Harvey Keitel). She played alongside actor Paul Gross in Slings and Arrows and Gordon Pinsent in Heyday. She appeared on the TV series Jeremiah from J. Michael Straczynski, as the character Libby (on Showtime, from 2003 to 2004). She also played the role of Sara Collins in Fox's 2006 series Vanished, and as the vampire Bianca in SciFi's The Dresden Files. She also appeared in the 2004 film Going the Distance.

From 2009 until 2014, she played the role of Secret Service agent Myka Bering on the Syfy series  Warehouse 13.

She also stars in the 2014 independent film Runoff, written and directed by Kimberly Levin, for which her performance received critical acclaim.

Awards and nominations 
Kelly was nominated for a Gemini Award in 2006 for Best Performance by an Actress in a Leading Role in a Dramatic Program or Mini-Series for Playing House.

Filmography

Film

Television

References

External links 

 

Canadian television actresses
Year of birth missing (living people)
Living people
Acadia University alumni
People from Newfoundland (island)
Canadian film actresses
Actresses from Newfoundland and Labrador